The 1992 World Wrestling Championships were held in Villeurbanne, France.

Medal table

Team ranking

Medal summary

Women's freestyle

Participating nations
96 competitors from 22 nations participated.

 (4)
 (1)
 (2)
 (5)
 (8)
 (3)
 (9)
 (2)
 (2)
 (2)
 (9)
 (3)
 (1)
 (1)
 (5)
 (3)
 (9)
 (4)
 (3)
 (7)
 (5)
 (8)

See also
 Wrestling at the 1992 Summer Olympics

References

External links
UWW Database

World Wrestling Championships
W
W
1992 in sport wrestling